The Vermont Teddy Bear Company (VTB) is one of the largest producers of teddy bears and the largest seller of teddy bears by mail order and Internet.  The company handcrafts each of its teddy bears and produces almost 500,000 teddy bears each year.  The company was formerly traded on the NASDAQ stock exchange under the ticker symbol BEAR, but was taken private by The Mustang Group, a Boston-based private equity firm, on September 30, 2005, partially to avoid the reporting requirements of the Sarbanes-Oxley Act.

History
The company was founded in 1981 by John Sortino, who sold handcrafted teddy bears in an open-air market in Burlington, Vermont.  Sortino happened upon the idea of packaging and selling bears through the mail when a tourist visiting Burlington wanted a bear mailed to her home.  The concept was called the "Bear-Gram", which features the customized teddy bear placed in a box (complete with an "air hole") and stuffed with other goodies.

By 1995, VTB had sponsored on the East Coast various guns-for-bears exchanges and expanded to the West Coast in 1996 starting with UC Irvine's Student Physicians for Social Responsibility and the Brea Police Department.

In May 1997, the Vermont Teddy Bear Co. filed a copyright infringement suit against Disney over "Pooh-Grams" being similar to its mail-order "Bear-Gram" trademark and logo.

VTB acquired Calyx & Corolla, an upscale flower company headquartered in Vero Beach, Florida, in 2003 but is no longer associated with VTB. One of Vermont Teddy Bear's marketing slogans claimed that sending a teddy bear is "a creative alternative to sending flowers." In 2005, the company launched a new sister company, Gift Bag Boutique, which offered handbags and purses along with many make-up accessories. Along with PajamaGram, which sold gift pajamas, and TastyGram, which offered gourmet food gifts, the creation of this sister company brought the total number of companies under the Vermont Teddy Bear umbrella to five.  Gift Bag Boutique and TastyGram stopped accepting orders as of June 26, 2008.

For Valentine's Day of 2005, Vermont Teddy Bear caused widespread controversy by offering a "Crazy for You" Bear which wore a white strait jacket with a red heart embroidered and a tag entitled "Commitment Papers" came with the bear. When mental health groups from all over the U.S. asked for the bear to be pulled out of production, VTB kept the bear up for sale but sold out quickly and Elizabeth Robert, the company head, resigned from the board of Vermont's largest hospital, Fletcher Allen Health Care. In May, VTB agreed to be acquired by a Mustang-Group-led investment group for $6.50 a share.

Factory and Retail Store 
By 1995, the company moved into its new headquarters in Vermont's Champlain Valley.  The company had two factories: one in Shelburne and one in Newport.  The Newport factory closed at the end of June 2010 while the Shelburne location remains the home of Vermont Teddy Bear.  The Shelburne factory is an especially popular tourist destination, and also served as a concert site for the annual Vermont Mozart Festival.  The company also maintained two retail locations in Vermont - Shelburne and Waterbury, however only the Shelburne store remains. 

They offer tours of their factory where they make over 750 jointed teddy bears every day.  They have over 50,000 visitors every year.   

With the Vermont Cub Project created in 2017, every Vermonter four years of age can go to the Bear Shop in Shelburne and make a free Vermont Teddy Bear (up to $39.99) after getting a coupon through their website. 

If you visit the Vermont Teddy Bear factory, you can make your very own bear.  With the help of a Bear Ambassador in the Make A Friend for Life room, there are lots of choices to be made.  First, you can select a bear with any kind of fur that you like.  Then you spin the special stuffing wheel to select what goes inside, ranging from magic to love and hugs.  Once the Teddy Bear is stuffed just the way you want it, it gets sewn up and brushed.  After the new bear is all finished a birth certificate is filled out.

Product Lines 
Vermont Teddy Bear has a wide product range of over 300+ items, the most popular being the 15" Jointed Bears in honey color.  The bears can also come in Buttercream, Vanilla, Black Licorice, Gray, Pink, as well as longer premium fur colors Maple, Espresso and Snow. VTB also has a wide range of outfits available for most occasions and events.  They recently have started carrying a variety of other animals including sloths, monkeys, and even dragons.  

Every Vermont Teddy Bear is 100% unconditionally guaranteed for life. That means that if anything ever happens to your Bear you can send it to the Vermont Teddy Bear Factory and they will nurse him or her back to health in the Bear Hospital at no charge.  In the very sad event that your Bear is too badly injured and has no hope for a complete recovery, they will replace your Bear with a new one for free!

In addition to the regular teddy bears they also release limited edition bears with a very small quantity produced usually in editions of 35 or 50.

Advertising
VTB was listed among "'a broad range of direct marketers' pitched by the show's hosts themselves" who were taking out more ads on talk radio in 2010, according to Dan Metter, director of talk-radio sales of Premiere Radio Networks.

References

Newport (city), Vermont
Manufacturing companies based in Vermont
Shelburne, Vermont
Toy companies of the United States
Privately held companies based in Vermont
Teddy bear manufacturers
American companies established in 1983
Toy companies established in 1983
1983 establishments in Vermont